The  is a museum in Naka-ku, Yokohama, Kanagawa Prefecture, Japan, dedicated to the maritime history of Japan and of the museum's operator, shipping company Nippon Yūsen Kabushiki Kaisha ("NYK Line"). It was opened in 1993.

Access
The museum is a two-minute walk from Bashamichi Station on the Minatomirai Line.

See also
Hikawa Maru
Japan Coast Guard Museum Yokohama

References

External links

Maritime Museums

Naka-ku, Yokohama
Museums in Yokohama
Maritime museums in Japan
Museums established in 1993
1993 establishments in Japan